Sebastiaan Jacobus "Ian" Hattingh  (born 31 October 1964) is a South African former rugby union player.

Playing career
Hattingh represented  at the annual Craven Week tournament for schoolboys. He made a successful transition from flanker to the frontrow during 1994. At the end of the 1994 season, he toured with the Springboks to Britain and Ireland. Hattingh did not play in any test matches but played in seven tour matches, scoring two tries for the Springboks.

See also
List of South Africa national rugby union players – Springbok no. 623

References

1964 births
Living people
South African rugby union players
South Africa international rugby union players
Falcons (rugby union) players
Golden Lions players
Rugby union players from Gauteng
Rugby union props